Mkhululi Nyathi (born 13 March 1995) is a Zimbabwean first-class cricketer. He was part of Zimbabwe's squad for the 2014 ICC Under-19 Cricket World Cup. In February 2017, he was named in an academy squad by Zimbabwe Cricket to tour England later that year.

References

External links
 

1995 births
Living people
Zimbabwean cricketers
Sportspeople from Midlands Province
Mid West Rhinos cricketers